Aspergillus thermomutatus (also called Neosartorya pseudofischeri) is a species of fungus in the genus Aspergillus. It is from the Fumigati section. The species was first described in 1992. It has been reported to produce asperfuran, cytochalasin-like compounds, fiscalin-like compounds, pyripyropens, and gliotoxin.

Growth and morphology

A. thermomutatus has been cultivated on both Czapek yeast extract agar (CYA) plates and Malt Extract Agar Oxoid® (MEAOX) plates. The growth morphology of the colonies can be seen in the pictures below.

References 

thermomutatus
Fungi described in 1992